Sardar Abdul Qayyum Khan Niazi is a Kashmiri politician from Azad Jammu and Kashmir who was the 13th Prime Minister of Azad Kashmir from August 2021 to April 2022.

Niazi won the recent legislative assembly election from the Abbaspur-Poonch area which was held on 25 July 2021.

Personal life
Sardar Abdul Qayyum Khan Niazi belongs to the Dulli Tribe of Hajira tehsil in Azad Kashmir's Poonch district. His village Darra Sher Khan is located in Poonch's Battal sector, which has seen much destruction in Indian shelling in the past. His family is settled in Islamabad, where they own businesses.

Niazi is not Abdul Qayyum's family name, but a pseudonym, and an interesting story is attached to this title. In a recent interview with Aaj News he shared the story that in 1974 in his matriculation class, coincidentally another student was also present with the same name. So when they had to fill out the examination forms he chose ‘Niazi’ as his Pen-name to differentiate from the other student. Whilst reading a list of PTI's nominated candidates during a rally in Bagh ahead of the elections, even Prime Minister Imran Khan had expressed surprise at Abdul Qayyum Khan Niazi's name, saying: "How did a Niazi get here? I am quite surprised. Though we Niazis have spread everywhere."

His elder brother, Sardar Ghulam Mustafa, has also been a minister while his younger brother, Sardar Habib Zia, is a lawyer and his son a councilor in the United Kingdom.

Career
Besides serving in the district council, Niazi remained the minister for food security between 2006 and 2008 in the Muslim Conference government, and the forest minister in the second cabinet of Sardar Ateeq from 2010 to 2011.

Graduating from the Azad Kashmir University and beginning his political career in 1980 as district councilor in Poonch, he and his family have been traditionally associated with the All Jammu and Kashmir Muslim Conference (AJKMC) party. Niazi became a member of the AJK Legislative Assembly on an AJKMC ticket in 2006 and held from 2006 to 2011 different ministerial portfolios in prison, finances and others.

On 14 April 2022, Niazi tendered his resignation as Prime Minister after a move by his parliamentary party — Pakistan Tehreek-e-Insaf — to replace him with regional president Sardar Tanveer Ilyas through a vote of no-confidence.

References

1959 births
Living people
Politicians from Azad Kashmir
Prime Ministers of Azad Kashmir
Pahari Pothwari people
Pakistan Tehreek-e-Insaf politicians
Azad Kashmir MLAs 2021–2026